Jesse Taitano is a professional mixed martial artist from Guam.  He competes in the flyweight division.

Mixed martial arts career
After fighting in Guam at the beginning of his career, Jesse Taitano eventually started fighting in Japan. Taitano's most notable fight was against Shooto's undisputed champion Shinichi Kojima, which ended up as a two-round draw. He also fought against top strawweight Noboru Tahara, in a 119-lbs catchweight bout, at Shooto - GIG Saitama 1 on August 9, 2009 Taitano fought Mamoru Yamaguchi at Vale Tudo Japan 2009 on October 30, 2009, losing via TKO. Taitano lost his most recent fights to Yuki Shojo at Shooto - The Way of Shooto 2: Like a Tiger, Like a Dragon and Junji Ito at Shooto - The Way of Shooto 5: Like a Tiger, Like a Dragon.

Mixed martial arts record

|-
| Loss
| align=center| 7-9-2
| Ale Cali
| TKO (referee stoppage)
| PXC 29
| 
| align=center| 3
| 
| Pasig, Philippines
| 
|-
| Loss
| align=center| 7-8-2
| Junji Ito
| TKO (punches)
| Shooto: The Way of Shooto 5: Like a Tiger, Like a Dragon
| 
| align=center| 3
| align=center| 4:50
| Tokyo, Japan
| 
|-
| Loss
| align=center| 7-7-2
| Yuki Shojo
| Decision (unanimous)
| Shooto: The Way of Shooto 2: Like a Tiger, Like a Dragon
| 
| align=center| 3
| align=center| 5:00
| Tokyo, Japan
| 
|-
| Loss
| align=center| 7-6-2
| Mamoru Yamaguchi
| TKO (punches)
| VTJ 2009 - Vale Tudo Japan 2009
| 
| align=center| 1
| align=center| 4:41
| Tokyo, Japan
| 
|-
| Loss
| align=center| 7-5-2
| Noboru Tahara
| Decision (unanimous)
| Shooto: Gig Saitama 1
| 
| align=center| 3
| align=center| 5:00
| Tokyo, Japan
| 119-lbs catchweight bout
|-
| Win
| align=center| 7-4-2
| Jay Muna
| Submission (arm-triangle choke)
| Rites of Passage 7 - Fists of Fury
| 
| align=center| 1
| align=center| 1:12
| Saipan, Northern Mariana Islands
| 
|-
| Draw
| align=center| 6-4-2
| Shinichi Kojima
| Draw
| Shooto: Shooto Tradition 5
| 
| align=center| 2
| align=center| 5:00
| Tokyo, Japan
| Two round, non-title bout
|-
| Loss
| align=center| 6-4-1
| Hiroyuki Tanaka
| Decision (unanimous)
| PXC 16 - The Beatdown
| 
| align=center| 3
| align=center| 5:00
| Mangilao, Guam
| 
|-
| Win
| align=center| 6-3-1
| Takeyasu Hirono
| KO
| PXC 14 - Evolution
| 
| align=center| 1
| align=center| N/A
| Mangilao, Guam
| 
|-
| Draw
| align=center| 5-3-1
| Yasuhiro Urushitani
| Draw
| GCM - Cage Force 5
| 
| align=center| 3
| align=center| 5:00
| Tokyo, Japan
| 
|-
| Win
| align=center| 5-3
| Andrew Sablan
| Decision (unanimous)
| PXC 13 - Back from the Dead
| 
| align=center| N/A
| align=center| N/A
| Mangilao, Guam
| 
|-
| Win
| align=center| 4-3
| Maurice Eazel
| KO
| PXC 12 - Settling the Score
| 
| align=center| 1
| align=center| N/A
| Mangilao, Guam
| 
|-
| Win
| align=center| 3-3
| Brian San Nicolas
| Submission (rear naked choke)
| PXC 11 - No Turning Back
| 
| align=center| 1
| align=center| N/A
| Mangilao, Guam
| 
|-
| Loss
| align=center| 2-3
| Albert Manners
| TKO (punches)
| PXC 10 - Final Redemption
| 
| align=center| N/A
| align=center| N/A
| Mangilao, Guam
| 
|-
| Loss
| align=center| 2-2
| A Sol Kwon
| TKO (punches)
| FFCF 7 - Locked and Loaded
| 
| align=center| 1
| align=center| N/A
| Mangilao, Guam
| 
|-
| Loss
| align=center| 2-1
| Takeyasu Hirono
| Decision (split)
| FFCF 4 - Collision
| 
| align=center| 3
| align=center| 5:00
| Guam
| 
|-
| Win
| align=center| 2-0
| Kevin Guillermo
| Decision (unanimous)
| FFCF Islands - Tinian
| 
| align=center| 3
| align=center| 5:00
| Tinian, Northern Mariana Islands
| 
|-
| Win
| align=center| 1-0
| Michael Limiac
| Decision (unanimous)
| JR 2 - Jungle Rules
| 
| align=center| 3
| align=center| 5:00
| Guam
|

References

External links

Guamanian male mixed martial artists
Flyweight mixed martial artists
Living people
Year of birth missing (living people)